The South Summit is a subsidiary peak to the primary peak of Mount Everest in the Himalayas. The primary peak of Mount Everest is  elevation above sea level.

Overview 
It was first climbed by Charles Evans and Tom Bourdillon of the 1953 British Mount Everest expedition on 26 May 1953. They arrived at 1 pm, too late to continue on to the primary summit, because of problems with Evans' oxygen set. Three days later, on 29 May, Edmund Hillary and Tenzing Norgay passed over the south summit to achieve the main peak.

History 
On reaching the South Col in 1953, expedition leader John Hunt was struck by the sight, writing "Above us rose the South Summit of Everest ... an elegant snow spire, breathtakingly close yet nearly 3000 feet above our heads ... none of us had been prepared for any spectacle quite so sharp, quite so beautiful as this. To me it seemed that a new and unsuspected peak of alpine stature stood above the South Col."

A geologist with a 1965 Indian Everest expedition discovered a deposit of fossils of seashells in limestone about 100 feet above the South Summit. This expedition put nine climbers on the main summit.

Describing his first ascent of Mount Everest without supplemental oxygen in 1978, Reinhold Messner described the South Summit as "quite a milestone for me".

During the 1996 Mount Everest disaster, mountain guide Rob Hall and three other people died at the South Summit while descending from the main summit in an unexpected blizzard. Hall survived overnight, and established radio contact the following day, but froze to death later that day, May 11, 1996. His body remains on the South Summit.

The south summit is a popular place for climbers to stop for various reasons, and to turn around if necessary. From this location the cornice traverse, Hillary Step, and summit can be seen in clear weather and for modern climbers using bottled oxygen, it is a favored spot to change oxygen bottles.

References

External links
PBS article about different locations on Everest including the South summit

Mount Everest
Mountains of Koshi Province
Mountains of Tibet
Eight-thousanders of the Himalayas